The 1999 Nokia Cup was a WTA Tier IV tournament held in Prostějov, Czech Republic, and the only edition of the Nokia Cup. Slovak Henrieta Nagyová won in the final 7–6(7–2), 6–4 against Silvia Farina.

Seeds

Draw

Finals

Top half

Bottom half

Qualifying

Seeds

Qualifiers

Lucky loser
  Katarína Studeníková

Qualifying draw

First qualifier

Second qualifier

Third qualifier

Fourth qualifier

External links
 1999 Nokia Cup Draw

1999 Singles
1999 WTA Tour